Otto Jensen may refer to:
 Otto Jensen (bishop), Norwegian bishop and politician
 Otto Jensen (cyclist), Danish cyclist
 Otto Møller Jensen, Danish child actor